Gymnastics at the 2010 Central American and Caribbean Games may refer to:

 Artistic gymnastics at the 2010 Central American and Caribbean Games
 Rhythmic gymnastics at the 2010 Central American and Caribbean Games
 Trampoline at the 2010 Central American and Caribbean Games